Saint Peter's Church, Ennisnag ( and  meaning "the Island or Islet of the Crane or Heron")  is a  church of the United Dioceses of Cashel and Ossory and  the ecclesiastical province of the United Provinces of Dublin and Cashel in the (Anglican) Church of Ireland. The church lies beside the Kings River, one mile north of Stoneyford village in County Kilkenny, Ireland. Located in the townland of Ennisnag, in the barony of Shillelogher.

The 19th century church was constructed on an old medieval monastery and church no longer extant. Probably the most distinguished rector and resident of Ennisnag was the famous Irish antiquarian, James Graves, who died in 1886. In the graveyard, Catholic burials to the rear and the Church of Ireland burials to the front. Among those buried there is Hubert Butler, the Anglo-Irish essayist.

History 

The Monastery of Ennisnag was an early Irish Christian monastery, and later a medieval prebendal church, located at Ennisnag, in County Kilkenny, Ireland. Little is known about the monastic community here. Canon William Carrigan suggested "an ancient Church stood on the site from time immemorial to after the Cromwellian era". John O'Hanlon reported that Diocese of Ossory ecclesiastical records names Saint Manchan as patron saint writing "at Inisnag, diocese of Ossory, St. Manchan, whose feast occurs on the 14th of February, was venerated as a patron (Statuta Dioecesis Ossoriensis)". So it was probably founded by Manchán of Mohill in the 5th or 6th century. The monastery of Inis-Snaig was probably small in scale. The church of Inisnag was recorded as prebendal of Ossory diocese, in the Taxatio Ecclesiastica of AD 1291–1292, and was granted on "the authority of Pope Nicholas IV, 1291 [liber ruber Ossoriensis]".  The medieval church fell into ruins after the Dissolution of the Monasteries, and upheavals of 17th century Ireland. The medieval monastery and church are no longer extant. From the ruins, St Peter's church, of Protestant denomination, was established in the early 19th century.

Architecture

Saint Peter's Church is a protected structure. The Board of First Fruits Church of Ireland built  the church 1815 under the architect William Robertson. The church contains a detached three-bay double-height over part-basement single-cell.

See also
 Religion in Ireland
 Protestantism in Ireland

References

Notes

Sources 

 .
 .
 .
 .
 .

External links

 

Churches in County Kilkenny
Church of Ireland church buildings in the Republic of Ireland